= Athletics at the 2016 Summer Paralympics – Qualification =

For the athletics competitions at the 2016 Summer Paralympics, the following qualification systems were in place. Qualification began on 15 October 2014 ends on 14 August 2016.

== Allocation of qualification slots ==
There is a maximum of 1100 athletics qualification slots available; 660 male and 440 female. In general, qualification slots are awarded to the athlete's National Paralympic Committee (NPC), not the individual athlete. The exception is with the Bipartite Commission Invitation slots, which are awarded to the individual athlete, not the NPC.

Each NPC can allocated a maximum of 48 male qualification slots and 32 female allocation slots (excluding Bipartite Commission Invitation slots). The slots cannot be transferred between gender; any unused slots are re allocated via the Bipartite Commission Invitation Allocation method.

Each NPC may enter up to three athletes in each individual event, one team of up to six athletes (but no less than four) in each relay event, and up to six athletes in each marathon event as long as no more than three athletes are competing in the marathon as their sole event. There is no limit on how many events an individual athlete may be entered in, as long as they have achieved the 'B' qualifying standard in that event between 15 October 2014 and 14 August 2016.

== Qualification system ==
Qualification slots are allocated in the following order:

Swimming at the 2016 Summer Paralympics – Qualification System
Method	Criteria	Total slots	
Method	Criteria	Male	Female
2015 Marathon World Championships	The top two athletes in each individual Paralympic event receives one qualification slot for their NPC.	6	4
2015 World Championships	The top two athletes in each individual Paralympic event receives one qualification slot for their NPC. Only one slot may be awarded per individual athlete; any remaining slots will be allocated via the AQS Qualification.	180	152
Rio 2016 Qualification Rankings	Based on athlete ranking for the period 1 April 2015 to 1 April 2016, the three highest ranked athletes in the top 5 of each individual event who have yet to qualify will receive one qualification slot for their NPC. Only one slot may be awarded per individual athlete; any remaining slots will be allocated via the AQS Qualification.	270	228
2016 IPC Athletics Marathon World Cup		9	6
AQS Qualification	Athletes who have achieved an 'A' qualifying standard (AQS) performance at an IPC recognised competition between 15 October 2014 and 20 June 2016 who have yet to qualify will receive a qualification slot. Only one slot may be awarded per individual athlete. If more athletes meet the AQS in each gender than the total number of slots available, each NPC's slot allocation will be scaled down. Any remaining slots will be allocated via the Bipartite Commission Invitation.	151	16
Relay Events		24	24
Bipartite Commission Invitation		20	10

== Qualifying standards ==
=== 100 metres ===
Class	Men's events		Women's events	
Class	'A' standard	'B' standard	'A' standard	'B' standard
T11	11.70	12.30	13.25	14.65
T12	11.40	11.90	13.00	14.30
T13	11.50	12.00	13.30	14.20
T33	23.00	26.00	—	
T34	16.70	20.00	20.80	24.00
T35	13.65	15.20	17.20	19.80
T36	12.75	13.70	16.40	17.30
T37	11.90	12.90	14.60	15.40
T38	11.85	13.00	14.40	15.80
T42	13.40	15.40	18.50	20.00
T44	11.75	12.50	14.20	15.40
T47	11.25	11.60	13.60	14.60
T51	25.50	30.00	—	
T52	18.70	20.50	32.00	35.00
T53	15.50	16.65	19.05	20.00
T54	14.65	15.15	17.80	18.90

=== 200 metres ===
Class	Men's events		Women's events	
Class	'A' standard	'B' standard	'A' standard	'B' standard
T11	24.10	26.00	28.20	31.00
T12	23.00	24.20	26.70	29.50
T35	29.00	32.00	36.50	42.00
T36	—		34.60	38.00
T42	28.50	34.00	—	
T44	23.30	25.80	30.50	33.00
T47	—		28.00	29.00

=== 400 metres ===
Class	Men's events		Women's events	
Class	'A' standard	'B' standard	'A' standard	'B' standard
T11	54.85	57.00	1:04.00	1:12.00
T12	52.40	54.50	1:02.50	1:11.00
T13	51.00	56.00	1:02.50	1:10.00
T20	51.50	54.80	1:04.00	1:10.00
T34	—		1:20.00	1:28.00
T36	1:00.00	1:10.00	—	
T37	57.00	1:02.50	1:13.20	1:20.00
T38	56.65	1:00.00	1:10.00	1:17.00
T44	57.00	1:01.00	1:20.00	1:30.00
T47	50.80	53.50	1:06.00	1:15.00
T51	1:37.00	1:50.00	—	
T52	1:04.00	1:09.00	1:20.00	1:30.00
T53	52.00	56.20	1:01.00	1:10.00
T54	47.80	50.00	58.50	1:03.00

=== 800 metres ===
Class	Men's events		Women's events	
Class	'A' standard	'B' standard	'A' standard	'B' standard
T34	1:55.00	2:03.00	2:25.00	2:45.00
T36	2:29.00	2:40.00	—	
T53	1:44.00	1:53.00	2:00.00	2:22.00
T54	1:37.00	1:38.80	1:58.00	2:10.00

=== 1500 metres ===
Class	Men's events		Women's events	
Class	'A' standard	'B' standard	'A' standard	'B' standard
T11	4:25.00	4:32.00	6:00.00	6:20.00
T13	4:07.50	4:12.00	5:00.00	5:35.00
T20	4:04.00	4:12.00	5:05.00	5:20.00
T37	4:40.00	4:55.00	—	
T38	5:00.00	5:10.00	—	
T46	4:15.00	4:29.00	—	
T52	4:20.00	5:00.00	—	
T54	3:02.70	3:09.00	3:42.00	4:00.00

=== 5000 metres ===
Class	Men's events		Women's events	
Class	'A' standard	'B' standard	'A' standard	'B' standard
T11	16:30.00	16:55.00	—	
T13	15:40.00	15:57.00	—	
T54	10:24.00	10:50.00	12:00.00	13:30.00

=== Marathon ===
Class	Men's events		Women's events	
Class	'A' standard	'B' standard	'A' standard	'B' standard
T12	2:42:00	3:00:00	3:27:00	3:45:00
T46	2:45:00	3:00:00	—	
T54	1:32:00	1:35:00	1:55:00	2:05:00

=== High jump ===
Men only

Class	Men's events	
Class	'A' standard	'B' standard
T42	1.60 m	1.40 m
T44	1.70 m	1.50 m
T47	1.65 m	1.50 m

=== Long jump ===
Class	Men's events		Women's events	
Class	'A' standard	'B' standard	'A' standard	'B' standard
T11	5.60 m	5.30 m	4.10 m	3.40 m
T12	6.50 m	5.90 m	4.40 m	3.70 m
T20	6.30 m	6.00 m	4.70 m	4.30 m
T36	4.50 m	4.00 m	—	
T37	5.45 m	5.00 m	3.95 m	3.50 m
T38	5.00 m	4.40 m	4.00 m	3.75 m
T42	4.90 m	4.40 m	3.00 m	2.80 m
T44	5.80 m	5.20 m	4.30 m	3.80 m
T47	6.45 m	6.10 m	4.45 m	4.00 m

=== Shot put ===
Class	Men's events		Women's events	
Class	'A' standard	'B' standard	'A' standard	'B' standard
F12	13.50 m	11.50 m	11.00 m	9.00 m
F20	13.10 m	11.00 m	11.00 m	9.50 m
F32	6.80 m	5.00 m	3.30 m	2.80 m
F33	7.80 m	6.50 m	3.90 m	3.50 m
F34	9.00 m	7.70 m	6.20 m	5.20 m
F35	11.30 m	9.00 m	7.00 m	6.00 m
F36	11.40 m	9.00 m	6.40 m	5.50 m
F37	12.50 m	11.00 m	9.30 m	7.50 m
F40	7.00 m	6.00 m	4.50 m	3.50 m
F41	10.40 m	8.70 m	6.00 m	5.00 m
F42	12.30 m	11.20 m	—	
F53	5.80 m	5.00 m	3.30 m	2.70 m
F55	10.00 m	9.00 m	5.75 m	4.30 m
F57	12.00 m	11.00 m	7.50 m	7.00 m

=== Discus throw ===
Class	Men's events		Women's events	
Class	'A' standard	'B' standard	'A' standard	'B' standard
F11	35.00 m	29.00 m	22.50 m	19.50 m
F37	45.00 m	39.00 m	—	
F38	—		26.50 m	22.00 m
F41	—		17.20 m	15.00 m
F44	46.00 m	40.00 m	22.00 m	18.00 m
F52	12.00 m	10.00 m	6.00 m	5.00 m
F55	—		16.00 m	14.00 m
F56	34.00 m	30.00 m	—	
F57	—		21.50 m	19.00 m

=== Javelin throw ===
Class	Men's events		Women's events	
Class	'A' standard	'B' standard	'A' standard	'B' standard
F13	48.50 m	41.00 m	29.00 m	19.00 m
F34	24.50 m	17.00 m	14.00 m	11.50 m
F37	—		21.00 m	17.00 m
F38	35.00 m	30.00 m	—	
F41	32.00 m	27.00 m	—	
F44	48.00 m	43.00 m	—	
F46	44.00 m	39.00 m	22.00 m	18.00 m
F54	22.00 m	19.70 m	11.80 m	10.00 m
F56	—		15.00 m	12.00 m
F57	36.00 m	31.00 m	—	

=== Club throw ===
Class	Men's events		Women's events	
Class	'A' standard	'B' standard	'A' standard	'B' standard
F32	24.00 m	18.00 m	15.50 m	13.00 m
F51	20.00 m	17.00 m	10.00 m	8.00 m
